Jack Dempsey vs. Georges Carpentier was a boxing fight between world heavyweight champion Jack Dempsey and world light-heavyweight champion Georges Carpentier, which was one of the fights named the "Fight of the Century". The bout took place in the United States on Saturday, July 2, 1921, at Boyle's Thirty Acres in Jersey City, New Jersey.

Pre-fight
Jack Dempsey was the world Heavyweight champion since he beat Jess Willard by a fourth round knockout in 1919. The challenge by Carpentier would be his third title defense, after retaining the championship against Billy Miske and Bill Brennan. Both Miske and Brennan died shortly after fighting Dempsey, of causes unrelated to their fights.

Carpentier was the world Light-Heavyweight champion, having beaten Battling Levinsky by a fourth round knockout in his previous bout to win the title at Westside Ballpark in Jersey City.

Despite the fact the bout was held in the United States, Dempsey, the American defending champion, was cast as an anti-hero whereas Carpentier, the French challenger, was seen as a hero by fans. This was partly due to the fact that Dempsey had not fought at war and Carpentier had, for the French Army. Dempsey was seen by many as a draft-dodger. Dempsey went on trial during 1920, accused of draft evasion. At the same time, he went through a divorce from his first wife, Maxine.

Tex Rickard, Dempsey's promoter, built up the fight, using the public's view of both fighters as a way to promote the bout. Rickard mainly operated out of the Madison Square Garden in New York, New York, but at the time he was having trouble with authorities at the New York State boxing commission and Tammany Hall. In addition, New York governor Nathan L. Miller opposed having the fight take place in his state.
Also, Rickard envisioned a larger crowd than the Madison Square Garden could fit coming to this fight, and he preferred boxing fights to be held at outside arenas so he built Boyle's Thirty Acres in Jersey City, with a capacity for 80,000 paying customers. Rickard borrowed an amount of $250,000 (in 1921 money) to make the arena.

Wireless Age, a technology magazine of the era, had held a convention at New York City from March 16 to the 19th of the same year. Julius Hopp was a concert organizer at the Madison Square Garden, and he asked Rickard for permission to broadcast the fight live on radio. Hopp then attended the convention and he was able to meet local radio enthusiasts. In addition, several radio stations had begun playing in New York City, including Westinghouse's KDKA. John Ringling, who  was Rickard's Madison Square Garden partner, opposed live transmission of the bout, but he relented once a compromise was reached to have radio equipment located outside the arena instead of inside it. AT&T also protested, refusing to connect a ringside telephone line to a transmitter.

The transmitter used was said to be the largest one ever built up to that time. It was built by General Electric and set up at the Lackawanna train terminal in Hoboken, from where the bout was transmitted by a temporary station, WJY, operated by the Radio Corporation of America, to theaters, halls and auditoriums in 61 other cities across the United States. The fight became the first world title fight to be carried over on radio, ushering in an era of boxing radiocasts that lasted until televised boxing came along.

The afternoon of July 2, 1921, the first fight to take place before the main event was one between boxers Frankie Burns and Packey O'Gatty. Burns won that fight on points in eight rounds.  The last preliminary bout before the main event featured Gene Tunney defeating Soldier Jones in seven rounds.  Tunney would eventually beat both Dempsey and Carpentier in later years.

The fight

Dempsey outweighed Carpentier by 20 pounds, weighing 188 to the French challenger's 168. According to Dempsey's autobiography, promoter Tex Rickard feared that Dempsey would annihilate Carpentier inside of one round so Rickard specifically asked the champion not to score an early knockout. Harry Ertle was the referee.

Both men wore white boxing trunks, although Carpentier's trunks had a vertical blue stripe running up each leg.

Predictably, Dempsey was the aggressive pursuer throughout the fight, while Carpentier relied on boxing skill and counter-punching.  

In round two, a solid right to the jaw had Dempsey groggy. But Dempsey recuperated and began dominating the bout in round three.

Less than a minute into the fourth round, Dempsey's relentless pressure resulted in Carpentier being floored with a stinging left-right combination from the champion.  It looked like Carpentier would not beat the count, but he rose to his feet suddenly at referee Harry Ertle's count of nine.  However, the fight ended shortly thereafter, at one minute and 16 seconds of round four, when Dempsey knocked out Carpentier with another combination that included a hard right hook to the body.

Aftermath
The Jack Dempsey versus Georges Carpentier bout was the first ever boxing fight to produce $1,000,000 in revenue, or a "million dollar gate" at a then record of $1,789,238. It was also the first heavyweight championship fight where women attended in great numbers.  This can be attributed to the favorable pre-fight press Carpentier had received in many New York City newspapers that portrayed him as a dashing, handsome and stylish French war hero. 

Dempsey kept the Heavyweight title until he lost it in 1926 to Gene Tunney on points after ten rounds. In 1927, he attempted to regain it from Tunney in what became known as The Long Count Fight, but again lost by ten rounds decision. He retired after that fight and operated a restaurant in New York City, dying in 1983 at age 87.

Carpentier fought twelve more times, going 7-4-1 during that span. One of those bouts was a fifteenth round knockout defeat at the hands of Tunney. He became an actor in France, participating in eight feature films. Carpentier died in 1975.

Both fighters are members of the International Boxing Hall of Fame.

References

External links
lobby poster to the fight

Carpentier
1921 in New Jersey
1921 in American sports
July 1921 sports events
Boxing matches